Tennis at the 2018 Asian Games was held at the Tennis Court of Jakabaring Sport City, Palembang, Indonesia from 19 to 25 August 2018.

Tennis had doubles and singles events for men and women, as well as a mixed doubles competition.

Schedule

Medalists

Medal table

Participating nations
A total of 159 athletes from 23 nations competed in tennis at the 2018 Asian Games:

See also
 Tennis at the Asian Games

References

External links
Tennis at the 2018 Asian Games
Official Result Book – Tennis

 
2018 Asian Games events
Asian Games
2018
2018 Asian Games